Bad Sobernheim is a former Verbandsgemeinde ("collective municipality") in the district of Bad Kreuznach, Rhineland-Palatinate, Germany. The seat of the Verbandsgemeinde was in Bad Sobernheim. On 1 January 2020 it was merged into the new Verbandsgemeinde Nahe-Glan.

The Verbandsgemeinde Bad Sobernheim consisted of the following Ortsgemeinden ("local municipalities"):

 Auen
 Bad Sobernheim
 Bärweiler
 Daubach
 Ippenschied
 Kirschroth
 Langenthal
 Lauschied
 Martinstein
 Meddersheim
 Merxheim
 Monzingen
 Nußbaum
 Odernheim am Glan
 Rehbach
 Seesbach
 Staudernheim
 Weiler bei Monzingen
 Winterburg

Former Verbandsgemeinden in Rhineland-Palatinate